Ichthyapus is a genus of eels in the snake eel family Ophichthidae.

Species
There are currently 7 recognized species in this genus:
 Ichthyapus acuticeps Barnard, 1923 (Sharpnose sand eel)
 Ichthyapus insularis J. E. McCosker, 2004
 Ichthyapus keramanus Machida, Hasimoto & Yamakawa, 1997 
 Ichthyapus ophioneus Evermann & M. C. Marsh, 1900 (Surf eel)
 Ichthyapus platyrhynchus Gosline, 1951
 Ichthyapus selachops D. S. Jordan & C. H. Gilbert, 1882 (Smiling snake eel)
 Ichthyapus vulturis M. C. W. Weber & de Beaufort, 1916 (Vulture sand eel)

References

Ophichthidae
Taxa named by Charles N. F. Brisout
Ray-finned fish genera